Alois Harrer (15 September 1926 – 23 September 2009) was a West German cross-country skier who competed in the 1950s. He finished 59th in the 18 km individual event at the 1952 Winter Olympics in Oslo. He was a policeman by profession.

References

External links
18 km Olympic cross country results: 1948-52

External links
 

1926 births
2009 deaths
Olympic cross-country skiers of Germany
Cross-country skiers at the 1952 Winter Olympics
German male cross-country skiers